Bistrița-Năsăud is a county (județ) of Romania, in Transylvania, with its capital city at Bistrița.

Name
In Hungarian, it is known as Beszterce-Naszód megye, and in German as Kreis Bistritz-Nassod. The name is identical with the county created in 1876, Beszterce-Naszód County in the Kingdom of Hungary (the county was recreated in 1940 after the Second Vienna Award, as it became part of Hungary again). Except these, as part of Romania, until 1925 the former administrative organizations were kept when a new county system was introduced. Between 1925–1940 and 1945–1950, most of its territory belonged to the Năsăud County, with smaller parts belonging to the Mureș, Cluj, and Someș counties.

Demographics 

 Romanians – 89.9%
 Hungarians – 5.3%
 Roma – 4.3%
 Germans (Transylvanian Saxons) – 0.1%

83.1% of inhabitants were Romanian Orthodox, 6.3% Pentecostal, 4.6% Reformed, 2.3% Greek-Catholic, 1.2% Roman Catholic, 0.8% Baptist, 0.7% belonged to "another religion", 0.5% Seventh-day Adventist, and 0.5% other or none.

Geography

One third of this surface represents the mountains from the Eastern Carpathians group: the Țibleș, Rodna, Bârgău and Călimani Mountains. The rest of the surface represents the North-East side of the Transylvanian Plateau.

The main river crossing the county is the Someșul Mare. On the Bistrița River there is a big dam and a lake.

Neighbours
 Suceava County in the East.
 Cluj County in the West.
 Maramureș County in the North.
 Mureș County in the South.

Politics
The Bistrița-Năsăud County Council, renewed at the 2020 local elections, consists of 30 counsellors, with the following party composition:

Administrative divisions

Bistrița-Năsăud County has 1 municipality, 3 towns and 58 communes.
Municipalities
Bistrița – capital city; 70,493 (as of 2011)
Towns
Beclean
Năsăud
Sângeorz-Băi

Communes
Bistrița Bârgăului
Braniștea
Budacu de Jos
Budești
Căianu Mic
Cetate
Chiochiș
Chiuza
Ciceu-Giurgești
Ciceu-Mihăiești
Coșbuc
Dumitra
Dumitrița
Feldru
Galații Bistriței
Ilva Mare
Ilva Mică
Josenii Bârgăului
Leșu
Lechința
Livezile
Lunca Ilvei
Maieru
Matei
Măgura Ilvei
Mărișelu
Miceștii de Câmpie
Milaș
Monor
Negrilești
Nimigea
Nușeni
Parva
Petru Rareș
Poiana Ilvei
Prundu Bârgăului
Rebra
Rebrișoara
Rodna
Romuli
Runcu Salvei
Salva
Sânmihaiu de Câmpie
Șieu
Șieu-Odorhei
Șieu-Măgheruș
Șieuț
Șintereag
Silivașu de Câmpie
Spermezeu
Șanț
Târlișua
Teaca
Telciu
Tiha Bârgăului
Uriu
Urmeniș
Zagra

People
Natives of the county include:
 George Coșbuc
 Liviu Rebreanu
 Andrei Mureșanu

See also
Former Beszterce-Naszód County of the Kingdom of Hungary

References

 
Counties of Romania
Geography of Transylvania
1968 establishments in Romania
States and territories established in 1968